Ilsan-gu is the name of two districts or wards (Ilsandong-gu, literally “Eastern Ilsan district”, and Ilsanseo-gu, literally “Western Ilsan district”) in Goyang, Gyeonggi-do, South Korea. Ilsan-gu was divided into Ilsandong-gu and Ilisanseo-gu on May 16, 2005.

External links 
 일산동 (Eastern Ilsan district) 
 일산서 (Western Ilsan district) 
 (Goyang Ilsan page in English)

Goyang